Amadeus may refer to:

Wolfgang Amadeus Mozart (1756–1791), prolific and influential composer of classical music
Amadeus (name), a given name and people with the name
Amadeus (play), 1979 stage play by Peter Shaffer
Amadeus (film), 1984 film based on the play
Amadeus (presenter) (1962), an Italian television and radio presenter
Amadeus Quartet, a former English string ensemble
Amadeus, a database of financial and business information on European firms, developed by Bureau van Dijk
Amadeus CRS, a computer reservation system used by airlines and travel agencies
Amadeus IT Group, a travel and tourism industry transaction processor and owner of Amadeus CRS
Amadeus Basin, a sedimentary basin in Australia
Amadeus Press, publishing house, imprint of Rowman & Littlefield
Amadeus (airline), former German airline

See also

Amade (name)
Amadea (disambiguation)
Amadee (disambiguation)
Amadeo (disambiguation)
Amédée (disambiguation)
Amedeo (disambiguation)